Frank Golembrosky (born May 3, 1945) is a Canadian former professional ice hockey player who played in the World Hockey Association (WHA). Golembrosky played part of the 1972–73 WHA season with the Philadelphia Blazers and Quebec Nordiques.

Awards
1965–66 Gary F. Longman Memorial Trophy (IHL)

Career statistics

References

External links

1945 births
Living people
Canadian ice hockey right wingers
Charlotte Checkers (EHL) players
Charlotte Checkers (SHL) players
Dayton Gems players
Ice hockey people from Calgary
Philadelphia Blazers players
Port Huron Flags (IHL) players
Quebec Nordiques (WHA) players
St. Catharines Black Hawks players
St. Louis Braves players
Canadian expatriate ice hockey players in the United States